Raymond "Ray" Giroux (born July 20, 1976) is a former Canadian professional ice hockey defenceman who played four seasons in the National Hockey League (NHL) for the New York Islanders and New Jersey Devils.

Giroux played collegiately at Yale University. During the 1997–98 season, he captained the best team in school history as Yale won their first ECAC regular season title (Yale has since won another regular season title in the 2008-09 season) and advanced to the NCAA tournament after only having been picked to finish in 10th place at the beginning of the season. In addition to being a 1st-team All American, Giroux was named ECAC Player of the Year as well as the league's best offensive defenceman and was one of ten finalists for the Hobey Baker Memorial Award, given annually to the nation's top collegiate player.

Giroux spent time in many NHL organizations before leaving the US to play overseas. He has played in the American Hockey League (AHL) for the Lowell Lock Monsters, Bridgeport Sound Tigers, Albany River Rats, and Houston Aeros.

Playing for Ak Bars he became Russian champion (2005/06) and IIHF European Champions Cup winner (2007). Giroux made his Kontinental Hockey League (KHL) debut playing with SKA Saint Petersburg during the inaugural 2008–09 KHL season. He participated in 2009 Kontinental Hockey League All-Star Game.

Career statistics

Awards and honours

References

External links

1976 births
Living people
AIK IF players
Ak Bars Kazan players
Albany River Rats players
Bridgeport Sound Tigers
Canadian expatriate ice hockey players in Finland
Canadian expatriate ice hockey players in Russia
Canadian expatriate ice hockey players in Sweden
Canadian ice hockey defencemen
Franco-Ontarian people
HIFK (ice hockey) players
Houston Aeros (1994–2013) players
Ice hockey people from Ontario
Jokerit players
Lowell Lock Monsters players
New Jersey Devils players
New York Islanders players
Philadelphia Flyers draft picks
SKA Saint Petersburg players
Sportspeople from North Bay, Ontario
Traktor Chelyabinsk players
AHCA Division I men's ice hockey All-Americans